is a junction passenger railway station inn the city of  Hitachinaka, Ibaraki, Japan, operated by East Japan Railway Company (JR East) and the third-sector railway operator Hitachinaka Seaside Railway.

Lines

Station layout
The station consists of two island platforms. The station building is elevated and is located above the platforms. The station has a Midori no Madoguchi staffed ticket office.

Platforms

History

The JR East (formerly JNR) Katsuta Station opened on 18 March 1910. The Hitachinaka Seaside Railway (formerly Minato Railway) station opened on 25 December 1913. The station was absorbed into the JR East network upon the privatization of Japanese National Railways (JNR) on 1 April 1987.

Passenger statistics
In fiscal 2019, the JR portion of the station was used by an average of 13,586 passengers daily (boarding passengers only). The Hitachinaka Seaside Railway station was used by an average of 834 passengers daily in fiscal 2011. The JR East passenger figures for previous years are as shown below.

Surrounding area
 Hitachi Seaside Park
Hitachinaka City Hall
HItachinaka Post Office
Hitachinaka General Hospital

See also
 List of railway stations in Japan

References

External links

 JR East station information 
 Hitachinaka Seaside Railway station information 

Railway stations in Ibaraki Prefecture
Jōban Line
Railway stations in Japan opened in 1910
Stations of East Japan Railway Company
Hitachinaka, Ibaraki